Nieuwland is the name of several Dutch villages:

 Nieuwland, Amersfoort, a neighbourhood of Amersfoort, in Utrecht
 Nieuwland, Brielle, a neighbourhood of Brielle, in South Holland
 Nieuwland, Schiedam, a neighbourhood of Schiedam, in South Holland
 Nieuwland, Vijfheerenlanden in Utrecht
 Nieuwland, Zeeland in the province of Zeeland, now part of Nieuw- en Sint Joosland
 Former name of Vierpolders, in South Holland.

See also
Nieuwland (surname)